John F. Gill (27 December 1898 – 10 June 1971) was an Irish trade union official and Labour Party politician.

He first stood for election at the June 1927 general election for the Laois–Offaly constituency, and joined William Davin as one of two Labour Teachta Dála (TDs) returned from Laois–Offaly to the 5th Dáil. This was the only occasion on which Laois–Offaly returned two Labour TDs.

However, Gill's term as a TD was short: the 5th Dáil was the shortest Dáil ever, lasting only 98 days. He lost his seat at the September 1927 general election, and was defeated again in his third and final candidacy, at the 1932 general election.

References

1898 births
1971 deaths
Labour Party (Ireland) TDs
Members of the 5th Dáil